The FIS Alpine World Ski Championships are international competitions in Alpine skiing. They are organized by the International Ski Federation (FIS).

Championships

2023
World Junior Alpine Skiing Championships 2023 

Dates: 19-25 January

Place: St Anton am Arlberg, Austria

Medals (1982-2022)

See also
 Alpine skiing at the Winter Olympics
 Alpine skiing at the Winter Paralympics
 Alpine skiing at the Youth Olympic Games
 Alpine skiing World Cup
 FIS Alpine World Ski Championships
 World Para Alpine Skiing Championships

External links
 https://data.fis-ski.com/global-links/statistics/event-overview.html?catcode=WJC&sectorcode=AL&Submit=SEARCH
 http://www.the-sports.org/alpine-skiing-fis-junior-world-ski-championships-1981-1982-medals-epa60767.html

 
Alpine skiing competitions
Alpine skiing Junior
International Ski Federation competitions
Alpine skiing
Recurring sporting events established in 1982